Agapanthiini is a tribe of longhorn beetles of the subfamily Lamiinae.

Taxonomy
 Aegoprepes Pascoe, 1871
 Agapanthia Audinet-Serville, 1835
 Agapanthiola Ganglbauer, 1900
 Aliboron J. Thomson, 1864
 Amillarus Thomson, 1857
 Anandra J. Thomson, 1864
 Anauxesida Jordan, 1894
 Anauxesis Thomson, 1857
 Antennohyllisia Breuning, 1963
 Aprosopus Guérin-Méneville, 1844
 Aulaconotopsis Breuning, 1940
 Aulaconotus Thomson, 1864
 Calamobius Guerin-Ménéville, 1849
 Chionosticta Pesarini & Sabbadini, 2004
 Cleptometopus Thomson, 1864
 Coreocalamobius Hasegawa, Han & Oh, 2014
 Cribrohammus Breuning, 1966
 Cristhippopsis Breuning, 1977
 Cylindrophelipara Breuning, 1940
 Deremius Kolbe, 1894
 Ectinogramma J. Thomson, 1864
 Elongatopothyne Breuning, 1963
 Eohyllisia Breuning, 1942
 Eucomatocera White, 1846
 Falsohippopsicon Breuning, 1942
 Falsohyllisia Breuning, 1949
 Grammopsis Aurivillius, 1900
 Grammopsoides Breuning, 1940
 Granopothyne Breuning, 1959
 Helvina Thomson, 1864
 Hippocephala Aurivillius, 1920
 Hippopsicon Thomson, 1858
 Hippopsis Lepeletier & Audinet-Serville, 1825
 Hyllisia Pascoe, 1864
 Hyllisiopsis Breuning, 1956
 Hypamazso Barrion & Khan, 2003
 Ludwigia Pic, 1891
 Megacera Audinet-Serville, 1835
 Metopoplectus Gressitt, 1937
 Mimohippopsicon Breuning, 1940
 Mimohippopsis Breuning, 1940
 Mimohyllisia Breuning, 1948
 Mimonicarete Breuning, 1957
 Nemotragus Guérin-Méneville, 1844
 Neoamphion Monné, 2005
 Neocalamobius Breuning, 1943
 Pachypeza Audinet-Serville, 1835
 Paracalamobius Breuning, 1982
 Parahyllisia Breuning, 1942
 Paranandra Breuning, 1940
 Paranauxesis Breuning, 1940
 Parasmermus Breuning, 1969
 Parhippopsicon Breuning, 1942
 Parhippopsis Breuning, 1973
 Phelipara Pascoe, 1866
 Philotoceraeoides Breuning, 1957
 Philotoceraeus Fairmaire, 1896
 Pothyne Thomson, 1864
 Pseudhippopsis Gestro, 1895
 Pseudocalamobius Kraatz, 1879
 Pseudogrammopsis Zajciw, 1960
 Pseudohyllisia Breuning, 1942
 Pseudopothyne Breuning, 1960
 Pseudosmermus Pic, 1934
 Psudocalamobius Kraatz, 1879
 Setohyllisia Breuning, 1949
 Spalacopsis Newman, 1842
 Spinogramma Breuning, 1947
 Tetraglenes Newman, 1842
 Theophilea Pic, 1895
 Trichohippopsis Breuning, 1958
 Trichohyllisia Breuning, 1942
 Trichopothyne Breuning, 1942
 Typocaeta Thomson, 1864
 Vittatopothyne Breuning, 1968
 Zipoetes Fairmaire
 Zipoetopsis Breuning, 1950

References

 
Lamiinae